Wafik Moustafa (born 16 July 1948 in Cairo) is a London-based doctor and British politician and political commentator on several Middle Eastern and international TV channels. He is the author of Egypt – The Elusive Arab Spring, Egypt - A Nation in CVrisis, published in London, as well as the founder and Chairman of the British Arab Network.

Professional career 
BBC Radio Arabic Service broadcast a two-hour special programme in August 2014 about Moustafa's career, social and political activities in the UK, including discussion about his book Egypt the Elusive Arab Spring.

Political activities 
Moustafa stood as a Conservative candidate for Bootle in Sefton, Merseyside in 2005. In this traditionally safe Labour seat, he came a distant third behind the Liberal Democrats. Moustafa also founded the Conservative Arab Network (CAN).

As a representative of the Muslim Conservative Network UK, Moustafa attended a session on The Role of Parliaments for Building Peaceful and Inclusive Societies and Combating Violent extremism at United Nations Headquarters in New York on 21 July 2016.

He attended the International Symposium on Cultural Diplomacy and Religion 2014, "The Promotion of World Peace through Inter-Faith Dialogue & the Unity of Faiths".

In July 2014, Moustafa delivered a keynote speech at the Inter-Parliamentary Coalition for Global Ethics conference (IPCGE) held at UNESCO HQ in Paris. His theme message was "We have to think culture of peace to achieve global harmony".

Author 
On the third anniversary of the Arab Spring in Egypt, in 2014, Gilgamesh in London published Moustafa's book Egypt – The Elusive Arab Spring.

Egypt - A nation in Crisis, published in 2016, is a book that covers the upheavals that took place in Egypt and other Arab countries and particular emphasis on the military coup led by General Sisi, the top of the first elected President in Egyptian history. It also expands on the role of the United States in the Middle East over the last two centuries.

Media activities 

Moustafa specialises in the culture and political history of the Middle East and the Arab world in particular. He is a commentator on British Arabs and Middle Eastern affairs, regularly appearing on television, radio and other media. His notable media appearances include:

 Inside Story – Al Jazeera (discussion of more homes facing demolition as Egyptian security forces warn people a buffer zone with Gaza is to be extended)
 Levant TV – talking about stifling freedom at Egyptian universities and the detention of 25,000 political activists from the Islamist and liberal opposition.
 ANB TV, when he discussed his book and explained how the Arab Spring has been aborted by the entrenched elements of the old regime and the military establishment.
 Eurovision Italy – interview in Rome on the Arab Spring and the current political and civil situation in Egypt.
He was appointed the main political commentator for Al Jazeera TV for the 2005 UK general election (at which he was a Conservative candidate) and the main commentator for Sky News during the Egyptian uprising in 2011.

Moustafa was a guest speaker at the Cairo International Media Conference in 2010, post-WikiLeaks, and at the televised debate on the future of Egypt and the Arab world in Lebanon.

References

External links 
 
 
 Delegation to Egypt

Conservative Party (UK) politicians
Living people
21st-century British medical doctors
1948 births
British people of Egyptian descent